Strega (Italian for "witch" or "sorceress") is a hardboiled detective novel written by American author and attorney Andrew Vachss, first published in 1987. The story features the pursuit and destruction by the protagonist Burke, an ex-con private investigator, of a pedophile ring involved in trading child pornography via telephone modems. The novel was written and published long before social concern over the use of the Internet for spreading or trading child pornography became widespread. It is the second novel in the Burke Series.

The novel is also significant because it introduces numerous characters who would go on to appear in all of the Burke series: Immaculata (Max's girlfriend and later mother to Flower); rescued child prostitute Terry (who would become Mole and Michelle's son); and Wolfe, who is serving as an Assistant District Attorney when the events in this story take place.

After the critical acclaim and commercial success of his first novel Flood, Vachss was contacted by Robert Gottlieb, then editor-in-chief of the New York publishing house Alfred A. Knopf, and signed a contract with an advance of US$175,000 for Strega. The novel subsequently won the 1988 Grand Prix de Littérature Policière, a prestigious French award for mystery and crime novels, and the 1989 Falcon Award by the Maltese Falcon Society of Japan.

References

1987 American novels
American crime novels
Novels by Andrew Vachss
Alfred A. Knopf books
Grand Prix de Littérature Policière winners